Intuición is the thirteenth studio album by Peruvian singer-songwriter Gian Marco released by Enjoymusic Plubishing on October 5, 2018.  It was his first album release in 3 years and the last one he released in the 2010's decade.

Promotion
A total of 8 songs were released as singles in order to promote the album including a new version of the song Empecemos A Vivir featuring Mexican singer Carlos Rivera. Gian Marco also appeared on several television shows throughout Latin America to promote the album starting with a performance of the first single on the show Un Nuevo Día. In 2019 he embarked on his "Intuición Tour" throughout the American continent to promote the album.

Commercial performance
The album had great success throughout Latin America and was certified triple platinum in Perú. The album received a nomination  for Best Singer-Songwriter Album at the 2019 Latin Grammy Awards. It is the best-selling album in Perú

Track listing

Certifications and sales

Accolades
20th Latin Grammy Awards

|-
|2019
|style="text-align:center;"|Intuición
|style="text-align:center;"|Best Singer-Songwriter Album
|
|-

References

Gian Marco albums
2018 albums
Spanish-language albums